In topology, a branch of mathematics, a topological space X is said to be simply connected at infinity if for any compact subset C of X, there is a compact set D in X containing C so that the induced map

 

is the zero map.  Intuitively, this is the property that loops far away from a small subspace of X can be collapsed, no matter how bad the small subspace is.

The Whitehead manifold is an example of a 3-manifold that is contractible but not simply connected at infinity. Since this property is invariant under homeomorphism, this proves that the Whitehead manifold is not homeomorphic to R3. 

References

Algebraic topology
Properties of topological spaces